Larry Jackson (born September 28, 1990) is an American soccer player-manager who last played and assistant managed for Oakland Roots SC in the National Independent Soccer Association.

Career

College and Amateur
Jackson played college soccer at Santa Clara University between 2009 and 2012.

Professional
Jackson went undrafted in the 2013 MLS SuperDraft, later trialing with Colorado Rapids. He signed his first professional contract with MLS club New England Revolution on April 9, 2014. He was released by the club on December 8, 2014.

Jackson signed with USL side Wilmington Hammerheads on March 3, 2015.

On July 15, 2019, Jackson joined Oakland Roots as a player-coach.

References

External links
 Santa Clara profile
 CSUEB profile

1990 births
Living people
American soccer players
Santa Clara Broncos men's soccer players
New England Revolution players
Wilmington Hammerheads FC players
Burlingame Dragons FC players
Fresno FC players
Oakland Roots SC players
USL Championship players
USL League Two players
National Independent Soccer Association players
Soccer players from California
Association football goalkeepers
Player-coaches
Cal State East Bay Pioneers men's soccer coaches
Cal State East Bay Pioneers women's soccer coaches